Sinocyclocheilus maitianheensis is a species of ray-finned fish in the genus Sinocyclocheilus.

References 

maitianheensis
Fish described in 1992